HMS Trinidad was an  destroyer that served with the Royal Navy. The ship was named after the island in the West Indies. Launched on 8 May 1918, the vessel entered service with the  Grand Fleet but saw no action during the during the First World War. After the Armistice, Trinidad joined the Mediterranean Fleet. War had broken out between Greece and Turkey and there was intelligence that the Soviet Union was selling warships to one of the belligerents. Trinidad was part of a small flotilla that was sent to investigate and, ultimately, halt this trade. However, it turned out to be a hoax. The destroyer subsequently returned to Constantinople. In 1930, the signing of the London Naval Treaty required the Royal Navy to retire older destroyers before acquiring new ones. Trinidad was one of those chosen for retirement and, on 16 February 1932, the destroyer was sold to be broken up.

Design and development

Trinidad was one of thirty-three Admiralty  destroyers ordered by the British Admiralty on 7 April 1917 as part of the Eleventh War Construction Programme.

Two funnels were fitted.

Armament consisted of three QF  Mk IV guns on the ship's centreline.  One was mounted raised on the forecastle, one between the funnels on a platform and one aft. The ship also mounted a single  2-pounder pom-pom anti-aircraft gun for air defence. Four  torpedo tubes were fitted in two twin rotating mounts aft. The ship was designed to mount two  torpedo tubes either side of the superstructure but this addition required the forecastle plating to be cut away, making the vessel very wet, so they were removed. The weight saved enabled the heavier Mark V 21-inch torpedo to be carried. Fire control included a training-only director, single Dumaresq and a Vickers range clock. The ship had a complement of 90 officers and ratings.

Construction and career
Trinidad was laid down by J. Samuel White at East Cowes on the Isle of Wight with the yard number 1507 on 15 September 1917, and launched on 8 May the following year. The ship was completed on 9 September. The vessel was the second to carry the name, which honoured the island of Trinidad in the West Indies.  On commissioning,Trinidad joined the Twelfth Destroyer Flotilla of the Grand Fleet.

With the First World War closing, the destroyer saw no action before the Armistice.  However, although the war had ended, fighting ensued between Greece and Turkey. The United Kingdom decided to send units of the Royal Navy to the front line. Trinidad was one of the ships chosen. The destroyer was commissioned in Malta on 9 December 1920 to join the Sixth Destroyer Flotilla of the Mediterranean Fleet and sailed to Constantinople. In August, the destroyer accompanied the destroyer leader  on a mission along the Black Sea coast of Anatolia to search for warships that it was alleged that the Soviet Union was passing on to the Kemalist forces which were creating Turkey out of the old Ottoman Empire. The ships were unsuccessful as the transaction was a hoax. The two vessels then returned and Trinidad relocated to Smyrna. On 14 September the following year, the destroyer accompanied the dreadnought battleship  to Chanak and then back to Constantinople.

On 22 April 1930, the United Kingdom signed the London Naval Treaty, which limited the total destroyer tonnage that the navy could operate. The S class was deemed out of date and ripe to be replaced with more modern ships, including the C and D-class destroyers. Trinidad was therefore retired and, on 16 February 1932, sold to Thos. W. Ward then broken up at Inverkeithing.

Pennant number

References

Citations

Bibliography

 
 
 
 
 
 
 
 
 

1918 ships
S-class destroyers (1917) of the Royal Navy
Ships built on the Isle of Wight
World War I destroyers of the United Kingdom